The Navier–Stokes existence and smoothness problem concerns the mathematical properties of solutions to the Navier–Stokes equations, a system of partial differential equations that describe the motion of a fluid in space.  Solutions to the Navier–Stokes equations are used in many practical applications.  However, theoretical understanding of the solutions to these equations is incomplete.  In particular, solutions of the Navier–Stokes equations often include turbulence, which remains one of the greatest unsolved problems in physics, despite its immense importance in science and engineering.

Even more basic (and seemingly intuitive) properties of the solutions to Navier–Stokes have never been proven.  For the three-dimensional system of equations, and given some initial conditions, mathematicians have neither proved that smooth solutions always exist, nor found any counter-examples.  This is called the Navier–Stokes existence and smoothness problem.

Since understanding the Navier–Stokes equations is considered to be the first step to understanding the elusive phenomenon of turbulence, the Clay Mathematics Institute in May 2000 made this problem one of its seven Millennium Prize problems in mathematics.  It offered a US$1,000,000 prize to the first person providing a solution for a specific statement of the problem:

The Navier–Stokes equations

In mathematics, the Navier–Stokes equations are a system of nonlinear partial differential equations for abstract vector fields of any size. In physics and engineering, they are a system of equations that model the motion of liquids or non-rarefied gases (in which the mean free path is short enough so that it can be thought of as a continuum mean instead of a collection of particles) using continuum mechanics. The equations are a statement of Newton's second law, with the forces modeled according to those in a viscous Newtonian fluid—as the sum of contributions by pressure, viscous stress and an external body force. Since the setting of the problem proposed by the Clay Mathematics Institute is in three dimensions, for an incompressible and homogeneous fluid, only that case is considered below.

Let  be a 3-dimensional vector field, the velocity of the fluid, and let  be the pressure of the fluid. The Navier–Stokes equations are:

 

Note that this is a vector equation, i.e. it has three scalar equations. Writing down the coordinates of the velocity and the external force

 

then for each  there is the corresponding scalar Navier–Stokes equation:

 

The unknowns are the velocity  and the pressure .  Since in three dimensions, there are three equations and four unknowns (three scalar velocities and the pressure), then a supplementary equation is needed. This extra equation is the continuity equation for incompressible fluids that describes the conservation of mass of the fluid:

 

Due to this last property, the solutions for the Navier–Stokes equations are searched in the set of solenoidal ("divergence-free") functions. For this flow of a homogeneous medium, density and viscosity are constants.

Since only its gradient appears, the pressure p can be eliminated by taking the curl of both sides of the Navier–Stokes equations. In this case the Navier–Stokes equations  reduce to the vorticity-transport equations.
Now, we are going to look at Nonlinearity

The Navier-Stokes equations are nonlinear because the terms in the equations do not have a simple linear relationship with each other. This means that the equations cannot be solved using traditional linear techniques, and more advanced methods must be used instead. Nonlinearity is important in the Navier-Stokes equations because it allows the equations to describe a wide range of fluid dynamics phenomena, including the formation of shock waves and other complex flow patterns. However, the nonlinearity of the Navier-Stokes equations also makes them more difficult to solve, as traditional linear methods may not work.

One way to understand the nonlinearity of the Navier-Stokes equations is to consider the term (v · ∇)v in the equations. This term represents the acceleration of the fluid, and it is a product of the velocity vector v and the gradient operator ∇. Because the gradient operator is a linear operator, the term (v · ∇)v is nonlinear in the velocity vector v. This means that the acceleration of the fluid depends on the magnitude and direction of the velocity, as well as the spatial distribution of the velocity within the fluid.

The nonlinear nature of the Navier-Stokes equations can be seen in the term , which represents the acceleration of the fluid due to its own velocity. This term is nonlinear because it involves the product of two velocity vectors, and the resulting acceleration is therefore dependent on the magnitude and direction of both vectors.

Another source of nonlinearity in the Navier-Stokes equations is the pressure term . The pressure in a fluid depends on the density and the gradient of the pressure, and this term is therefore nonlinear in the pressure.
One example of the nonlinear nature of the Navier-Stokes equations can be seen in the case of a fluid flowing around a circular obstacle. In this case, the velocity of the fluid near the obstacle will be higher than the velocity of the fluid farther away from the obstacle. This results in a pressure gradient, with higher pressure near the obstacle and lower pressure farther away.

To see this more explicitly, consider the case of a circular obstacle of radius  placed in a uniform flow with velocity  and density . Let  be the velocity of the fluid at position  and time , and let  be the pressure at the same position and time.

The Navier-Stokes equations in this case are:

 
 

where  is the kinematic viscosity of the fluid.

Assuming that the flow is steady (meaning that the velocity and pressure do not vary with time), we can set the time derivative terms equal to zero:

 
 

We can now consider the flow near the circular obstacle. In this region, the velocity of the fluid will be higher than the uniform flow velocity  due to the presence of the obstacle. This results in a nonlinear term  in the Navier-Stokes equations that is proportional to the velocity of the fluid.

At the same time, the presence of the obstacle will also result in a pressure gradient, with higher pressure near the obstacle and lower pressure farther away. This can be seen by considering the continuity equation, which states that the mass flow rate through any surface must be constant. Since the velocity is higher near the obstacle, the mass flow rate through a surface near the obstacle will be higher than the mass flow rate through a surface farther away from the obstacle. This can be compensated for by a pressure gradient, with higher pressure near the obstacle and lower pressure farther away.

As a result of these nonlinear effects, the Navier-Stokes equations in this case become difficult to solve, and approximations or numerical methods must be used to find the velocity and pressure fields in the flow.
Consider the case of a two-dimensional fluid flow in a rectangular domain, with a velocity field  and a pressure field . We can use a finite element method to solve the Navier-Stokes equation for the velocity field:

To do this, we divide the domain into a series of smaller elements, and represent the velocity field as:

Substituting this expression into the Navier-Stokes equation and applying the finite element method, we can derive a system of ordinary differential equations:

where  is the domain, and the integrals are over the domain. This system of ordinary differential equations can be solved using techniques such as the finite element method or spectral methods.

Such method can be applied as:
we can use a variety of techniques, such as the finite element method or spectral methods.

One common approach is to use a finite difference method, which involves approximating the derivative terms in the equation using finite differences. To do this, we can divide the time interval  into a series of smaller time steps, and approximate the derivative at each time step using a finite difference formula:

This process can be repeated until we reach the final time step .

There are many other approaches to solving ordinary differential equations, each with its own advantages and disadvantages. The choice of approach depends on the specific equation being solved, and the desired accuracy and efficiency of the solution.

Two settings: unbounded and periodic space
There are two different settings for the one-million-dollar-prize Navier–Stokes existence and smoothness problem. The original problem is in the whole space , which needs extra conditions on the growth behavior of the initial condition and the solutions. In order to rule out the problems at infinity, the Navier–Stokes equations can be set in a periodic framework, which implies that they are no longer working on the whole space  but in the 3-dimensional torus . Each case will be treated separately.

Statement of the problem in the whole space

Hypotheses and growth conditions

The initial condition  is assumed to be a smooth and divergence-free function (see smooth function) such that, for every multi-index  (see multi-index notation) and any , there exists a constant  such that

  for all 

The external force  is assumed to be a smooth function as well, and satisfies a very analogous inequality (now the multi-index includes time derivatives as well):

  for all 

More precisely, the following assumptions are made:

 
 There exists a constant  such that  for all 

Condition 1 implies that the functions are smooth and globally defined and condition 2 means that the kinetic energy of the solution is globally bounded.

The Millennium Prize conjectures in the whole space
(A) Existence and smoothness of the Navier–Stokes solutions in 

Let . For any initial condition  satisfying the above hypotheses there exist smooth and globally defined solutions to the Navier–Stokes equations, i.e. there is a velocity vector  and a pressure  satisfying conditions 1 and 2 above.

(B) Breakdown of the Navier–Stokes solutions in 

There exists an initial condition  and an external force  such that there exists no solutions  and  satisfying conditions 1 and 2 above.

The Millennium Prize conjectures are two mathematical problems that were chosen by the Clay Mathematics Institute as the most important unsolved problems in mathematics. The first conjecture, which is known as the "smoothness" conjecture, states that there should always exist smooth and globally defined solutions to the Navier–Stokes equations in three-dimensional space. The second conjecture, known as the "breakdown" conjecture, states that there should be at least one set of initial conditions and external forces for which there are no smooth solutions to the Navier–Stokes equations.
The Navier-Stokes equations are a set of partial differential equations that describe the motion of fluids. They are given by:

The first equation is known as the momentum equation, and the second equation is known as the continuity equation.

These equations are typically accompanied by boundary conditions, which describe the behavior of the fluid at the edges of the domain. For example, in the case of a fluid flowing through a pipe, the boundary conditions might specify that the velocity and pressure are fixed at the walls of the pipe.

The Navier-Stokes equations are nonlinear and highly coupled, making them difficult to solve in general. In particular, the difficulty of solving these equations lies in the term , which represents the nonlinear advection of the velocity field by itself. This term makes the Navier-Stokes equations highly sensitive to initial conditions, and it is the main reason why the Millennium Prize conjectures are so challenging.

In addition to the mathematical challenges of solving the Navier-Stokes equations, there are also many practical challenges in applying these equations to real-world situations. For example, the Navier-Stokes equations are often used to model fluid flows that are turbulent, which means that the fluid is highly chaotic and unpredictable. Turbulence is a difficult phenomenon to model and understand, and it adds another layer of complexity to the problem of solving the Navier-Stokes equations.
To solve the Navier-Stokes equations, we need to find a velocity field  and a pressure field  that satisfy the equations and the given boundary conditions. This can be done using a variety of numerical techniques, such as finite element methods, spectral methods, or finite difference methods.

For example, consider the case of a two-dimensional fluid flow in a rectangular domain, with velocity and pressure fields  and a pressure field ,respectively. The Navier-Stokes equations can be written as:

The boundary conditions might specify that the velocity is fixed at the walls of the domain, or that the pressure is fixed at certain points.

To solve these equations numerically, we can divide the domain into a series of smaller elements, and solve the equations locally within each element. For example, using a finite element method, we might represent the velocity and pressure fields as:

Substituting these expressions into the Navier-Stokes equations and applying the finite element method, we can derive a system of ordinary differential equations

Statement of the periodic problem

Hypotheses

The functions sought now are periodic in the space variables of period 1. More precisely, let  be the unitary vector in the i- direction:

 

Then  is periodic in the space variables if for any , then:

 

Notice that this is considering the coordinates mod 1. This allows working not on the whole space  but on the quotient space , which turns out to be the 3-dimensional torus:

 

Now the hypotheses can be stated properly. The initial condition  is assumed to be a smooth and divergence-free function and the external force  is assumed to be a smooth function as well. The type of solutions that are physically relevant are those who satisfy these conditions: 

Just as in the previous case, condition 3 implies that the functions are smooth and globally defined and condition 4 means that the kinetic energy of the solution is globally bounded.

The periodic Millennium Prize theorems
(C) Existence and smoothness of the Navier–Stokes solutions in 

Let . For any initial condition  satisfying the above hypotheses there exist smooth and globally defined solutions to the Navier–Stokes equations, i.e. there is a velocity vector  and a pressure  satisfying conditions 3 and 4 above.

(D) Breakdown of the Navier–Stokes solutions in 

There exists an initial condition  and an external force  such that there exists no solutions  and  satisfying conditions 3 and 4 above.

Partial results
 The Navier–Stokes problem in two dimensions was solved by the 1960s: there exist smooth and globally defined solutions.
 If the initial velocity  is sufficiently small then the statement is true: there are smooth and globally defined solutions to the Navier–Stokes equations.
It is not known if the solutions exist beyond that "blowup time" T. 
Jean Leray in 1934 proved the existence of so-called weak solutions to the Navier–Stokes equations, satisfying the equations in mean value, not pointwise.
Terence Tao in 2016 published a finite time blowup result for an averaged version of the 3-dimensional Navier–Stokes equation.  He writes that the result formalizes a "supercriticality barrier" for the global regularity problem for the true Navier–Stokes equations, and claims that the method of proof hints at a possible route to establishing blowup for the true equations.

In popular culture
Unsolved problems have been used to indicate a rare mathematical talent in fiction. The Navier-Stokes problem features in The Mathematician's Shiva (2014), a book about a prestigious, deceased, fictional mathematician named Rachela Karnokovitch taking the proof to her grave in protest of academia. The movie Gifted (2017) referenced the Millennium Prize problems and dealt with the potential for a 7-year-old girl and her deceased mathematician mother for solving the Navier–Stokes problem.

See also 

 List of unsolved problems in mathematics
 List of unsolved problems in physics

Notes

References

Further reading

External links
  Contributed by: Yakov Sinai
 The Clay Mathematics Institute's Navier–Stokes equation prize
 Why global regularity for Navier–Stokes is hard — Possible routes to resolution are scrutinized by Terence Tao.
 Navier–Stokes existence and smoothness (Millennium Prize Problem) A lecture on the problem by Luis Caffarelli.
 

Fluid dynamics
Millennium Prize Problems
Partial differential equations
Unsolved problems in mathematics
Unsolved problems in physics